Frank Giglio (born November 9, 1933) is an American plumber and politician.

Born in Chicago, Illinois, Giglio served in the United States Army. He went to Saint Joseph's College and then received his bachelor's degree from Governors State University. Giglio was a plumber and lived in Calumet City, Illinois. He served in the Illinois House of Representatives from 1975 to 1979 and from 1981 to 1995. Giglio was a Democrat.

Notes

1933 births
Living people
Politicians from Chicago
People from Calumet City, Illinois
Military personnel from Illinois
Saint Joseph's College (Indiana) alumni
Governors State University alumni
American plumbers
Democratic Party members of the Illinois House of Representatives